Lieutenant General Francis John "Frank" Hickling  (born 13 October 1941) is a retired senior Australian Army officer, whose career culminated with his appointment as Chief of Army from 1998 to 2000.

Military career
Hickling graduated from the Officer Cadet School, Portsea, in 1961. He undertook regimental postings with the Royal Australian Engineers, and saw service in Vietnam from 1970 to 1971.

After serving as the Director of Plans, Army, Hickling was appointed Commander, Northern Command and received the Conspicuous Service Cross (CSC) for service in that role in 1993. This was followed by a posting as General Officer Commanding Training Command from 1992 to 1994.

Made commandant of the Australian Defence Force Academy in 1995, Hickling was appointed an Officer of the Order of Australia (AO) for distinguished service to the Army and Australian Defence Force in the field of military training in 1996. On promotion to  Major General, Hickling then served as  Commandant, Australian Defence Force Academy followed by Land Commander Australia from 1996 until 1998. In February 1998, he led Operation Bel Isi, a peace monitoring mission to Bougainville following a break in civil unrest in the country.

Hickling was promoted lieutenant general and appointed Chief of the Army in 1998. As Chief of the Army he deployed Australian troops to East Timor.

In retirement he chaired the Review of the Australian Defence Force Cadets (ADFC) Scheme which reported in 2008. Hickling also served as Senior Mentor, Australian College of Defence and Strategic Studies, and Advisor to BAE Systems. Hickling remains the Representative Colonel Commandant, Royal Australian Engineers.

References

|-

|-

1941 births
Australian generals
Australian military personnel of the Vietnam War
Graduates of the Officer Cadet School, Portsea
Living people
People from New South Wales
Officers of the Order of Australia
Recipients of the Conspicuous Service Cross (Australia)
Australian military engineers
Military personnel from New South Wales
Chiefs of Army (Australia)